Sigma Alpha Epsilon, commonly known as SAE, is a North American Greek-letter social college fraternity. It was founded at the University of Alabama in Tuscaloosa, Alabama, on March 9, 1856. Of all existing national social fraternities today, Sigma Alpha Epsilon is the only one founded in the Antebellum South. Its national headquarters, the Levere Memorial Temple, was established on the campus of Northwestern University in Evanston, Illinois, in 1929. The fraternity's mission statement is "To promote the highest standards of friendship, scholarship and service for our members based upon the ideals set forth by our Founders and as specifically enunciated in our creed."

The fraternity has chapters and colonies in 50 states and provinces as of 2011. The creed of Sigma Alpha Epsilon, The True Gentleman, must be memorized and recited by all prospective members. In March 2014, the fraternity announced that it was eliminating the tradition of pledging following several alcohol- and drug-related incidents.

Sigma Alpha Epsilon had nine deaths linked to drinking, drugs and hazing between 2006 and 2013, more than any other Greek organization in the United States according to data compiled by Bloomberg. During the 2010s, at least 18 Sigma Alpha Epsilon chapters were suspended, closed, or banned.

History

Sigma Alpha Epsilon was founded on March 9, 1856, at the University of Alabama in Tuscaloosa, Alabama. Its founders were Noble Leslie DeVotie, Nathan Elams Cockrell, Samuel Marion Dennis, John Barrett Rudulph, Abner Edwin Patton, Wade Hampton Foster, Thomas Chappell Cook, and John Webb Kerr. Their leader was DeVotie, who wrote the ritual, created the grip, and chose the name. Rudulph designed the fraternity badge. Of all existing national social fraternities today, Sigma Alpha Epsilon is the only national fraternity founded in the Antebellum South.

Patton was selected as the fraternity's first president. In the fall of 1856, Patton was the only Sigma Alpha Epsilon founder still enrolled at the university and continued to serve as its president. His efforts led to the expansion of the fraternity to the University of Nashville (now Vanderbilt University), Union College, and the University of North Carolina at Chapel Hill in January and February of 1857. By the end of 1857, the fraternity had grown to seven chapters. Its first national convention met in the summer of 1858 at Murfreesboro, Tennessee, with four of its eight chapters in attendance. 

By the time the American Civil War began in 1861, fifteen chapters had been established. The fraternity had fewer than 400 members when the Civil War began. Of those, 370 went to war for the Confederate States and seven for the Union Army. Seventy-four members of the fraternity lost their lives in the war, including founders Dennis, DeVotie, and Patton.

Fraternal history notes that Noble Leslie DeVotie was the first person to die in the Civil War, though this is in dispute. DeVotie lost his footing while boarding a steamer at Fort Morgan, Alabama, on February 12, 1861, hit his head and drowned. His body washed ashore three days later. Because Alabama had already seceded from the Union in January of that year, DeVotie is viewed by many to be the first casualty of the war. He is recognized as such by the state of Alabama.

After the Civil War, a small chapter at Columbian College, which is now George Washington University in Washington, D.C., was the only chapter to survive.

When a few of the young veterans returned to the Georgia Military Institute in Marietta, Georgia, and found their college burned to the ground, they decided to enter the University of Georgia in Athens, Georgia. The chapter there, which was established at the end of 1865, along with the reestablishment of a chapter at the University of Virginia in Charlottesville, Virginia, led to the fraternity's revival. Soon, other chapters came back to life and, in 1867, the first post-war convention was held in Nashville, Tennessee, where a half-dozen revived chapters planned the fraternity's future growth.

In the 1870s and early 1880s, more than a score of new chapters were formed. Older chapters died as fast as new ones were established. By 1886, the fraternity had chartered 49 chapters, but few were active. The first northern chapter had been established at Pennsylvania College (now Gettysburg College in Gettysburg, Pennsylvania), in 1883, and a second was placed at Mount Union College in Alliance, Ohio two years later.

Soon after, 16-year-old Harry Bunting entered Southwestern Presbyterian University in Clarksville, Tennessee, now known as Rhodes College in Memphis, Tennessee. He was initiated into the Tennessee Zeta Chapter, which had previously initiated two of his brothers. In just eight years, Harry Bunting and his younger brother, George, emboldened Sigma Alpha Epsilon chapters to increase their membership. They wrote encouraging articles in the fraternity's quarterly journal, The Record, promoting better chapter standards. Above all, they gave new life to old chapters in the South (including the mother chapter at Alabama) and founded new ones in the North and West. The Buntings were responsible for an explosion of growth, founding nearly 50 chapters of Sigma Alpha Epsilon. When Harry Bunting founded the Northwestern University chapter in 1894, he initiated as a charter member William Collin "Billy" Levere. Bunting passed the torch of leadership to Levere, and for the next three decades, Levere's high spirits brought the fraternity to maturity.

When Levere died on February 22, 1927, the fraternity's Supreme Council decided to name the new national headquarters building The Levere Memorial Temple. Construction of the Temple, an immense German Gothic structure located near Lake Michigan across from the Northwestern University campus in Evanston, Illinois, was started in 1929 and dedicated in the winter of 1930.

When the Supreme Council met regularly in the early 1930s at the Temple, educator John O. Moseley, the fraternity's national president, lamented, "We have in the Temple a magnificent school-house. Why can we not have a school?" Accordingly, the economic depression notwithstanding, the fraternity's first Leadership School was held under the direction of Moseley in the summer of 1935. In the last years of Moseley's life, he served the fraternity as its executive secretary, capping an academic career that included two college presidencies.

The Levere Memorial Temple

The fraternity's international headquarters, also known as the Fraternity Service Center, is maintained at the Levere Memorial Temple in Evanston, Illinois. The fraternity approved a plan to construct a national headquarters at its 1920 convention and its design was approved at the 1928 convention. It was built between mid-1929 and 1930, and was dedicated on December 28, 1930. The building was named for member William Levere who left $25,000 dollars in his will to the fraternity.

The Levere Memorial Temple serves as a war memorial for fraternities members and houses a museum on the first floor with a collection of historical photographs, pictures, and collections from private sources. The basement contains the Panhellenic Room, on the ceiling of which are the coats-of-arms of 40 college fraternities and 17 sororities. The niches on the north side contain large murals showing the founding of Phi Beta Kappa in 1776 and that of Sigma Alpha Epsilon in 1856, together with other murals depicting episodes in the history of the fraternity. The Panhellenic Room features a reproduction of Raphael's The School of Athens, painted by Johannes Waller in the 1930s. Some windows throughout the building depict college and university seals in stained glass from institutions with Sigma Alpha Epsilon chapters.

The building is used today for ceremonies and receptions by social and academic organizations at Northwestern University. The fraternity hosts a number of national conferences for Sigma Alpha Epsilon members at the temple. The chapel of the Temple, with its vaulted ceiling and stained glass windows by Tiffany is also used for religious services and weddings of Sigma Alpha Epsilon members and others.

Government
In its early days, the government of the Fraternity was vested in a single chapter, designated the Grand Chapter. The first such chapter was North Carolina Xi at the University of North Carolina at Chapel Hill, which was responsible only to the general convention, the last was Tennessee Omega at the University of the South, in Sewanee, Tennessee.

Today Sigma Alpha Epsilon is governed by Fraternity Conventions which are held biennially. At Conventions, brothers from all over the country come together to consider modifications to the Fraternity Laws, to the Ritual and to elect national officers. Between Conventions, SAE is governed by an all-volunteer Supreme Council; composed of the Eminent Supreme Archon (President), Eminent Supreme Deputy Archon (VP), Eminent Supreme Warden (Treasurer), Eminent Supreme Herald, and Eminent Supreme Chronicler. An Honorary Eminent Supreme Archon is also selected by the Past ESAs. The Executive Director of Sigma Alpha Epsilon (a full-time paid staff position) holds the title of Eminent Supreme Recorder and serves as the Chief Executive Officer of the organization. He is supported by a 25+ person full-time staff based at the Levere Memorial Temple as well as in the field. The Fraternity Convention also elects members to serve on the SAE Foundation Board of Directors (11-members total) and the SAE Financial and Housing Board of Directors (7-members total).

In addition, Sigma Alpha Epsilon is governed more locally through Province Conventions. A province is a section of the Realm which is composed of nearby chapters. These provinces meet regularly to discuss issues concerning its individual chapters. Each of the 30 provinces are led by a Province Archon supported by a Province Council.

The Diomedians

At one point, the fraternity had an alumni affiliate called the Diomedians. This organization was founded in 1918 in New York City, and its ritual was first "exemplified" in May 1919 and a National Council with the power to grant charters was established that June. A convention in St. Louis a year and a half later incorporated the Diomedians into the organizational structure of the fraternity and created the "Diomedian degree". By 1923 Diomedian chapters were established in Michigan and Pittsburgh and a Diomedian club-house "designed to furnish a modest home for young men just out of college" was established at 51 West 48th Street in New York.

Chapters

Members

Hazing and alcohol related deaths and injuries

Sigma Alpha Epsilon has had nine deaths linked to drinking, drugs and hazing since 2006, more than any other Greek organization, according to data compiled by Bloomberg in 2013. More than 100 chapters have been disciplined since 2007, with at least fifteen suspended or closed since 2010. A potential initiate to the SAE chapter at Salisbury University in Maryland alleged that Justin Stuart was beaten with a paddle, forced to drink alcohol to the point of losing consciousness and confined in a basement for nine hours without access to food, water or a bathroom while being subjected to music torture, an experience described as being "almost like Guantanamo Bay". The allegations were verified by a university investigation that led to the suspension of the chapter on the grounds that it had violated Salisbury policies on alcohol, hazing, and threats or acts of violence.

In May 2013, members of the Arizona State chapter allegedly left an underage member outside a hospital with a note saying "Ive been drinking and I need some help."  The 20-year-old survived after nearly 20 shots of tequila resulting in a near lethal blood alcohol content of 0.47%, according to doctors.

As a result of these incidents, student members pay among the highest rates for liability insurance of any fraternity. In March 2014 JPMorgan Chase stopped managing an investment account of SAE's charitable foundation, with bad publicity from hazing as the likely cause.

In January 2019, a newly-initiated freshman member of the chapter at the University of California, Irvine died from alcohol poisoning with allegations of fraternity hazing rituals still under investigation.

Elimination of pledging process

In 2013, the national fraternity organization responded to hazing allegations, stating that it has "zero tolerance for hazing," and that the reported infractions represent a low percentage of its more than 219 chapters and 15,000 college members. Following the 2011 hazing-related death of a Cornell University sophomore who was blindfolded, bound and forced to drink shots of vodka then left dying in the empty fraternity house, a constitutional amendment to ban alcohol at all chapter houses was proposed at the 155th national conference, but the measure failed to reach the two-thirds majority needed.

In March 2014 the fraternity revised its membership process to replace the term "pledge" with "new member" and require that initiation be completed within 96 hours of new members receiving bids. The SAE national president cited efforts to combat hazing, treat all members of the fraternity equally, and to protect the reputation of the fraternity as primary reasons for the change. The fraternity will now be following the True Gentleman Initiative, which will require all members to continue their education of the fraternity throughout all 4 years.

Suspensions and chapter closings

Sexual assault and harassment

According to several campus newspapers and the 2015 documentary The Hunting Ground, students today commonly joke that SAE stands for "sexual assault expected" because of the many members who have been accused of sexual assault.

In 2012, an incident of alleged sexual misconduct with a freshman girl with a member at Louisiana State University (LSU) occurred. Also that same year, the LSU chapter was accused of severely beating pledges.  The chapter was suspended until January 2015.

In 2014, a rape allegedly took place at an SAE party at Loyola Marymount University. The national organization reacted by closing the chapter.

In December 2014, Stanford University announced a two-year suspension of SAE housing due to reports of sexual harassment. After a second university investigation found that members had deterred a student from filing a Title IX concern and had intimidated and harassed another student believed to have filed a Title IX complaint, the chapter's housing was "indefinitely" revoked in May 2015.

In January 2015, a victim was hospitalized following allegations of sexual assault at a party at a SAE Iowa State University party. The incident is under investigation by police and the chapter suspended the member suspected of the assault.

In March 2015, Johns Hopkins University suspended the local SAE chapter until Spring 2016 after an alleged sexual assault at one of their parties.

The Yale University chapter was temporarily banned against use of the university email and bulletin board system as well as association of the fraternity name and the university following "inappropriate comments" made by SAE members.

In February 2017, the SAE chapter at Northwestern University was suspended indefinitely after four women alleged they were given date rape drugs at an SAE party, and two stated they were later sexually assaulted.

In August 2018, the SAE National Fraternity and the chapter at the University of California, Los Angeles were sued for negligence after a member of the ZBT Fraternity assaulted a woman at an SAE event. The lawsuit also encompassed the Zeta Beta Tau fraternity as well as UCLA.

In August 2020, the SAE chapter at West Virginia University was suspended for sexual assault.

Hazing, safety, alcohol and drug violations

The founding chapter at the University of Alabama was suspended in 1988 on cocaine-trafficking charges and for violating the university's code against drug use and trafficking. The suspension was lifted in 1990, but with a checklist of improvement goals that the chapter was required to fulfill; in 1992, the chapter was suspended again for failing to meet the outlined goals.

In the fall of 1991, the University of Houston chapter was suspended when the fraternity's president bit off a finger of a female guest's hand during an altercation with her boyfriend at a party held at the fraternity house.

In 1997, the Louisiana State University chapter was suspended after one member died from alcohol poisoning. Another member was praised for rescuing more than a dozen of his passed out brothers from death by ferrying them to the nearest hospital single-handedly.

The chapter at Southern Methodist University was placed on "deferred suspension" following a drug-related death in 2006, and then again for abuse and hazing that occurred in 2017.

The chapter at Bucknell University was suspended from 2011 to 2016 and the chapter at Dickinson College from 2012 to 2017 for hazing and alcohol violations.

In spring 2012, the Miami University chapter of SAE was suspended after an early morning "fireworks battle" with the neighboring Phi Kappa Tau house led to Oxford police seizing considerable amounts of drug paraphernalia from both houses. Since the groups were temporarily unrecognized while on suspension, sophomores who were living there under fraternity exemption from Miami's two-year campus housing policy were required to vacate the houses and move on campus. As a result, SAE's national organization sued Miami for $10 million, claiming "severe emotional distress" and "substantial lost income and reputation" for the exiled students. Susan Dlott, judge of the Southern District of Ohio, dismissed SAE's lawsuit in February 2013 with prejudice (meaning it could not be refiled), saying that "...the fraternity failed to submit any facts that supported its claims the public university violated its constitutional rights against unreasonable search and seizure and due process." In November 2015, the Miami SAE chapter was allowed to recolonize by Miami's Interfraternity Council.

In 2013, the chapter at Arizona State University was banned from campus due to repeated hazing and alcohol violations and questionable behavior. Jack Culolias, an ASU freshman and SAE pledge, was kicked out of a bar one night then later found dead in a ditch. The chapter also faced heavy scrutiny when a member nearly died after participating in a tequila drinking contest.

In October 2014, the University of Southern California chapter was closed for reportedly "violating members' health and safety".

In April 2015, the University of Arizona chapter was placed under a "cease-and-desist order" by the Sigma Alpha Epsilon headquarters, meaning all activities are suspended until further notice. The chapter was accused of severely hazing and harming students pledging the fraternity.

In July 2015, the University of Richmond (Virginia) chapter was suspended indefinitely "based on repeated incidents that violated the University's policies and risk management procedures." An investigation had been opened in April, when the national organization suspended the chapter after two women were hurt falling from a balcony during a ski trip.

In January 2016, the chapter at Dartmouth College was suspended by the national office and derecognized by the university for violations of health and safety regulations as well as a failure to comply with the national organization's standards.  The fraternity was previously cited for hazing violations in 2009 and 2012.

In April 2016, the UMBC chapter was suspended after allegations of alcohol policy violations, property theft and damage, and failure to comply with previous sanctions (also handed for underage drinking, in a party that resulted in 55 police citations). The University's Student Judicial Board determined that the claims were substantiated, and suspended the chapter for four years.

In October 2016, the chapter at Auburn University was suspended for two years after multiple hazing and risk management policy violations over a two-year period.

In November 2017, the SAE chapter at the University of Texas at Austin was suspended for hazing violations. Two years prior, several members from the chapter were accused of beating up a male neighbor complaining about loud music that was playing at their fraternity house during a recruitment event. Only two members were identified and charged with physical assault for the incident. This prompted the chapter to disaffiliate from SAE. The chapter retained the fraternity house and is regulated by its alumni board.

In December 2017, the SAE chapter at the University of Mississippi was suspended due to “health-and-safety concerns and an inability to adhere to the national organization’s standards and expectations." The Mississippi Gamma chapter has been recolonized as of Fall, 2020.

In March 2018, the SAE chapter at the University of Idaho was suspended after an ongoing investigation by the national organization confirmed the chapter's failure to abide by its national guidelines, including certain safety and health violations. The university was made aware of the ongoing investigation in December 2017 after the chapter was put on a cease and desist order by the national fraternity. The university also learned the allegations included hazing and is conducting an additional investigation into that claim as part of the university's student code of conduct process. As part of the closure agreement, the university, in conjunction with SAE's national office, will allow SAE to recolonize in August 2022 under certain conditions, including the expectation that members must keep a dry chapter facility and have a live-in advisor.

In January 2019, the SAE chapter at the University of California, Irvine was suspended after the death of a freshman newly initiated member of the fraternity. In March 2019, the Orange County coroner's office announced that the death was found to have been caused by alcohol poisoning and the chapter was closed indefinitely amidst allegations of fraternity hazing rituals but the details are still under investigation .

In February 2019, the SAE chapter at Tennessee Technological University was placed on suspension for four to five years, or until all current members have graduated or left Tennessee Tech. The closure follows the death of a  Tech graduate and former fraternity member, who died one day after attending the "senior transition night," at the SAE house on Dec. 7, 2018.

In April 2019, the SAE chapter at Vanderbilt University was suspended until 2023 for multiple hazing violations.

In December 2021, eight members of the fraternity at Georgia College and State University were arrested for providing alcohol to minors and one member for hazing.  The arrests happened after a SAE pledge was hospitalized due to an alcohol related hazing incident.

In June 2022, the SAE chapter at the University of New Hampshire was suspended pending an investigation into a hazing incident that occurred in April. Arrest warrants were issued for 46 members of the chapter, as well as a warrant charging the chapter itself with student hazing.

Discriminatory incidents

In 1982 SAE members at the University of Cincinnati were suspended for a racially insensitive party corresponding with Martin Luther King Jr.'s birthday.

In 2002, Syracuse University officials suspended the chapter there after a member appeared in blackface. The member was expelled from the university. The chapter returned after the suspension and in 2006 was found guilty of hazing a new member by the University's Office of Fraternity and Sorority Affairs.

In 2013, SAE pledges at Washington University in St. Louis allegedly recited lyrics to Dr. Dre's "Bitches Ain't Shit" in slam poetry form within close proximity of several African-American students in the university's dining hall. Chapter operations were halted for several months while the chapter was put under investigation due to allegations of racist behavior stemming from the incident. The chapter was fully reinstated following the investigation.

In 2014, the chapter at Clemson University hosted a "Cripmas" party in reference to the  Southern California-based African-American crips gang. The chapter "suspended all activity indefinitely", according to the SAE national office.

Also, in 2014, SAE members at the University of Arizona were suspended for attacking Alpha Epsilon Pi, a Jewish fraternity.

In March 2015, the national organization of Sigma Alpha Epsilon closed the University of Oklahoma chapter after a video surfaced showing members chanting a song which featured the racial slur, "nigger," and made references to lynching and racial segregation. The chant, set to melody of the popular children's song, "If You're Happy and You Know It", declares, "There will never be a nigger at SAE / There will never be a nigger at SAE / You can hang him from a tree, but he'll never sign with me / There will never be a nigger at SAE." Sigma Alpha Epsilon closed the charter of the involved chapter and suspended its members on  March 8, 2015. The University of Oklahoma president, David Boren, simultaneously closed the chapter house, giving members two days to vacate the fraternity's campus dwellings. On March 10, 2015, two students identified in the video were expelled from the university.

In May 2016, the SAE chapter at the University of Wisconsin–Madison was placed on suspension for repeatedly using racist, homophobic, and anti-Semitic slurs, and then ostracizing a black SAE member for speaking up against the chapter's behavior.

Undisclosed reasons

The Chapman University chapter was suspended from 2014 to 2019 for undisclosed reasons.

In November 2019, the SAE chapter at Duke University was suspended, with specific reasons not being cited.

See also
List of social fraternities and sororities

References

Further reading

External links

The Record of Sigma Alpha Epsilon

 
Student organizations established in 1856
North American Interfraternity Conference
Student societies in the United States
Fraternity Leadership Association
1856 establishments in Alabama